Paul Musso (4 December 1931 – 30 June 2021) was a French sports shooter. He competed in the 50 metre pistol event at the 1968 Summer Olympics. Musso died on 30 June 2021, at the age of 89.

References

External links
 

1931 births
2021 deaths
French male sport shooters
Olympic shooters of France
Shooters at the 1968 Summer Olympics
Sportspeople from Marseille